M. K. Lokesh is an Indian Civil servant and was the Indian ambassador to United Arab Emirates.

Positions held
Ambassador to Switzerland.

Indian Foreign Service
He is a 1977 batch officer of the Indian Foreign Service.

Indian Ambassadors to United Arab Emirates

References

Year of birth missing (living people)
Living people
Ambassadors of India to the United Arab Emirates
Indian Foreign Service officers
Ambassadors of India to the Holy See